West Coast hip hop is a regional genre of hip hop music that encompasses any artists or music that originated in the west coast of the United States. West Coast hip hop began to dominate from a radio play and sales standpoint during the early to-mid 1990s with the birth of G-funk and the emergence of record labels such as Suge Knight and Dr. Dre's Death Row Records, Ice Cube's Lench Mob Records, the continued success of Eazy-E's Ruthless Records, Aftermath Records belonging to Dr. Dre, and others.

History

Early years
Several events laid the foundations for West Coast hip hop, long before the emergence of West Coast rappers such as Mellow Man Ace, Too Short, Kid Frost, Ice-T and Eazy-E—or even before the emergence of rap itself. According to Syd Caesar, "a cataclysmic event helped give rise to it out West: the Watts riots of 1965." In 1967, Budd Schulberg founded a creative space in Los Angeles entitled Watts Writers Workshop, intended to help the people of the Watts neighborhood and provide a place for them to express themselves freely; one group to emerge from the workshop was the proto-rap group Watts Prophets.

In the late 1970s in Los Angeles, Alonzo Williams, a young disc jockey from Compton, California formed a partnership with another DJ named Rodger Clayton from Los Angeles, California who created a promotion company called Unique Dreams that would hire Williams to DJ at local events. The two eventually went their separate ways: Williams started a group called the World Class Wreckin' Cru and became the house DJs at a local nightclub called Eve's After Dark while Clayton launched what would perhaps be the foremost successful mobile DJ crew in the region by the name of Uncle Jamm's Army that would host parties by top DJs for thousands of people at large venues. Other smaller DJ and party crews emerged around this time, hoping to establish themselves in the area. Unlike their East Coast counterparts, the Hip-Hop sound emerging from Southern California was more fast-paced and influenced by electronic music. This could be largely credited to the fact that the local West Coast hip-hop scene revolved more around DJing than rapping. A localized dance sub-culture later came out of this party scene, which was highlighted on a national scale on such motion pictures as Breakin'. Breakdancing, popping and locking gave the Los Angeles music scene some of its earliest credibility outside the region. Further attention came to the West Coast as Uncle Jamm's Army began inviting such well-known East Coast Hip-Hop acts such as Whodini and Run-DMC to their functions.

Another early landmark occurred in 1981, when Duffy Hooks launched the first West Coast rap label, Rappers Rapp Records, inspired by Sugar Hill Records in New York. Its first act was the duo of Disco Daddy and Captain Rapp, whose debut single was "The Gigolo Rapp" which was also released in 1981. The song became a minor success but failed to gain much radio play. Many other Hip-Hop songs recorded in California were released during the early 1980s, but many of them received little or no radio play. Captain Rapp created the classic West Coast song released in 1983 called,"Bad Times (I Can't Stand It)", which is a politically conscious response to Grandmaster Flash's "The Message" arranged by the legendary production duo of Jimmy Jam & Terry Lewis and Rich Cason. Clayton's group, Uncle Jamm's Army, released their first single, "Dial-a-Freak", and in 1984 Egyptian Lover released his On the Nile album, which includes the popular 12" single "Egypt Egypt". Members of Uncle Jamm's Army and the World Class Wreckin' Cru, including Dr. Dre, The Unknown DJ, Egyptian Lover, Ice-T and Kid Frost would later go on to help define the early West Coast hip hop sound throughout the 1980s.

In the same period, the Compton-based former locking dancer Alonzo Williams formed the World Class Wreckin' Cru, which included future N.W.A members Dr. Dre and DJ Yella. Williams also founded Kru-Cut Records and established a recording studio in the back of his nightclub, Eve's After Dark, which was founded in 1979. The club was where local drug dealer Eazy-E and Jerry Heller decided to start Ruthless Records and where Dr. Dre and DJ Yella met the group CIA, which included future N.W.A member Ice Cube, Laylaw, Dr. Dre's cousin Sir Jinx and K-Dee.

During this period, one of the greatest factors in the spread of West Coast hip hop was the radio station, 1580 KDAY, which was the first radio station in the U.S. to play rap and Hip-Hop 24 hours a day, and radio DJ Greg "Mack Attack" Mack.

Late 1980s and 1990s
Ice-T is known as one of the pioneers of West Coast Hip Hop and gangsta rap, with songs such as "6 in the Mornin," released in 1986, demonstrating the unique style of the west coast. In 1988, Ice-T released the R&B hit "I'm Your Pusher", and Too Short released album "Life is ・・Too short".
In 1988, N.W.A's landmark album Straight Outta Compton was released. Focusing on life and adversities in Compton, California, a notoriously rough area which had gained a reputation for gang violence, it was released by group member Eazy-E's record label Ruthless Records. As well as establishing a basis for the popularity of gangsta rap, the album drew much attention to West Coast hip hop, especially the Los Angeles scene. In particular, the controversial "Fuck tha Police" and the ensuing censorship attracted substantial media coverage and public attention. Following the dissolution of N.W.A due to in-fighting, the group's members Eazy-E, Dr. Dre, Ice Cube and MC Ren would later become platinum-selling solo artists in the 1990s. Ice Cube released some of the West Coast's most critically acclaimed albums, such as 1990's AmeriKKKa's Most Wanted and 1991's Death Certificate, as well as making film and television appearances such as in John Singleton's Boyz n the Hood in 1991.

The early 1990s was a period in which Hip-Hop went from strength to strength. Tupac Shakur's debut album 2Pacalypse Now was released in 1991, demonstrating a social awareness, with attacks on social injustice such as racism, police brutality, poverty, crime, drug and teenage pregnancy. This album featured 3 singles: "Brenda's Got a Baby", "Trapped" and "If My Homie Calls". 2Pacalypse Now was certified Gold by the Recording Industry Association of America (RIAA) on April 19, 1995. Shakur's music and philosophy was rooted in various philosophies and approaches, including the Black Panther Party, Black nationalism, egalitarianism and liberty. Tupac sold over 75 million records, being regarded as one of the greatest rappers of all time and a pioneer of West Coast rap.
Also in 1991, Suge Knight founded Death Row Records. In 1992, Dr. Dre released his solo debut, The Chronic; this marked the birth of the G-funk sound that became a hallmark of the West Coast sound in the 1990s, with the album's lead single "Nuthin' but a 'G' Thang" peaking at #2 on the US Billboard Hot 100. Other Death Row releases such as Snoop Doggy Dogg's Doggystyle (1993), Tha Dogg Pound's Dogg Food (1995), and 2Pac's All Eyez on Me (1996) became huge sellers and were also critically acclaimed. 2 Pac gained hits California Love" and "Live and Die in LA". Many rappers such as MC Eiht and Compton's Most Wanted, Above The Low, D.O.C., Yo-Yo, Da Lench Mob, WC & the Maad Circle from LA, Too Short, Ant Banks, Spice 1 from Oakland, E-40, B-Legit, Celly Cell, Khyree and Ray Luv from Vallejo released rap CDs. Also in the early-to-mid 1990s, the group Cypress Hill made a big impact on the scene with their albums such as their debut studio album of the same name and Black Sunday. They are considered to be among the main progenitors of West Coast rap and hip-hop. Other popular artists and groups from this period include The Pharcyde (known for their albums Bizarre Ride II the Pharcyde and Labcabincalifornia), Souls of Mischief (known for their album 93 'til Infinity), Ahmad (known for his song Back in the Day), Xzibit (known for his album At the Speed of Life) and Ras Kass (known for his album Soul on Ice).

The popularity of Hip-Hop was undoubtedly assisted by the ensuing feud between Death Row Records and the East Coast's Bad Boy Records, fronted by Puff Daddy and The Notorious B.I.G. The east–west feud gained particular traction when Shakur was shot on November 30, 1994 outside Quad Recording Studios in New York, coincidentally where Biggie Smalls and Puff Daddy had been recording that day, which led Shakur to accuse them of setting him up. Tensions rose to their highest at the Source Awards in 1995, with artists from both sides making indirect comments about the other.

The drive-by shooting of Tupac Shakur on September 7, 1996 which led to his death almost a week later due to his injuries on September 13, 1996 was a major turning point for Hip-Hop as a whole. Shakur had been  the West Coast's most popular rapper and among the most critically acclaimed. After his death and Suge Knight's incarceration, Death Row Records - once home to the majority of the West Coast's mainstream rappers - fell into obscurity in 1997. The death of the East Coast rapper and former Tupac adversary, The Notorious B.I.G, concluded the west–east feud that had riddled Hip-Hop throughout the 1990s. The West Coast scene slowly started to fade from the mainstream, and rap fans moved towards the East Coast and Southern scene. Fans loved 1990s rapper such as Nas and the Wu-Tang Clan. In addition, Southern hip hop acts like Master P and Three 6 Mafia reached the mainstream in the early 2000s and, arguably, Atlanta's rap scene became the most popular in the country with the rise of crunk in 2003–2004.

2000s and 2010s 

West Coast hip hop's position in the mainstream dwindled greatly in the late 1990s and 2000s, with a few notable exceptions such as Dr. Dre's 2001, Xzibit's Restless, Snoop Dogg's No Limit Top Dogg and Tha Last Meal albums. However, the trend soon changed. Although gangsta rap was still popular on the West Coast in the 2000s, the West Coast sound became more designed for nightclubs with the rise of the Bay Area's hyphy scene, featuring flamboyant raps and explicit references to sex and drugs. A key artist in the genre was E-40, who found a substantial audience with his 1995 album In a Major Way; he found even greater success with the song "Tell Me When to Go" in 2006, featuring Oakland rapper Keak da Sneak.

Bay area rapper Too Short, already well known for his collaborations with artists such as Tupac Shakur and The Notorious B.I.G, found a new lease on life with the hyphy scene, his 16th studio album Blow the Whistle in 2006 debuting at number 14 on the Billboard 200. The Game also brought attention back to the West Coast with his double platinum album, The Documentary, as did Xzibit's platinum certified Restless album, and gold certified albums Man vs. Machine and Weapons of Mass Destruction. Artists from the 1990s such as Snoop Dogg and Ice Cube and groups such as the Tha Dogg Pound and Westside Connection continued to release albums throughout the 2000s and had success but did not garner the same level of fame as they had experienced in the 1990s. Throughout the 2000s, a number of peripheral West Coast hip hop artists such as Ya Boy, Glasses Malone, Juice, SKG (Suge Knight Girl) Helecia Choyce, Crooked I, 40 Glocc, Slim the Mobster, Bishop Lamont and Mistah F.A.B. collaborated with big-name artists such as Dr. Dre, Kurupt, Daz Dillinger, The Game, E-40 and Snoop Dogg.

In the early to mid-2010s, the West Coast had also seen a resurgence with hyphy as well as a transition to an uptempo and club-oriented type of Pop Rap.

Producer DJ Mustard had pioneered the "ratchet" music movement, a production style that has snowballed into the mainstream. DJ Mustard played a role in bringing West Coast hip hop back to national attention through the 2010s. He gained huge popularity throughout 2011 to 2014, producing a number of popular artists' singles, including Tyga's "Rack City", 2 Chainz's "I'm Different", Young Jeezy's "R.I.P.", B.o.B's "HeadBand", YG's "My Nigga" and "Who Do You Love?", Ty Dolla Sign's "Paranoid", Kid Ink's "Show Me" and Trey Songz's "Na Na". Mustard also released his debut mixtape, Ketchup, in 2013, further solidifying his ratchet sound, which follows its G-funk and hyphy predecessors.

Other more peripheral acts that achieved moderate, cult following success in the mainstream include Lil B, who built a strong fan base via social media outlets such as Twitter, YouTube, and MySpace, and has recorded both solo and with The Pack.

As a result, with the resurgence of hyphy and the progression of the ratchet movement through the 2010s, the West Coast has spawned commercially successful rappers such as G-Eazy, Tyga, Jay Rock, Droop-E, Sage the Gemini and Iamsu! of The HBK Gang, YG, Kid Ink, Nipsey Hussle, Dom Kennedy, Ty Dolla Sign, DJ King Assassin, Dizzy Wright and Problem. During the same time, alternative rap acts have also begun to gain traction along the West Coast hip hop scene such as Tyler, the Creator and his Odd Future collective. In addition, Hip-Hop artists who are more socially conscious and focus more on the lyrical aspects of Hip-Hop have also risen from crews such as solo acts Hopsin and group acts such as Black Hippy, entering the mainstream and releasing a number of critically acclaimed and commercially successful albums.

Odd Future achieved success with their album in 2012 called, The OF Tape Vol. 2, which peaked at #5 on the US Billboard 200 and #1 on both the US Billboard Independent Albums and Top R&B/Hip-Hop Albums charts. Artists from the group such as Tyler, the Creator, Earl Sweatshirt and Frank Ocean also achieved solo success with their own albums with Tyler, The Creator and Frank Ocean getting nominated for multiple Grammys.

That same year, Black Hippy's own Kendrick Lamar 2012 release, Good Kid, M.A.A.D City, was met with rave reviews and was featured on many critics' end-of-year lists. The album was nominated Album of the Year at the 56th Annual Grammy Awards, marking the first time any West Coast hip hop was nominated for award. In 2014, Schoolboy Q debuted at no.1 on the Billboard 200 with 139,000 copies sold. YG's My Krazy Life debuted at #2 on the US Billboard 200 with 61,000 copies sold.

In 2018, a multiple Grammy nominated artist under Aftermath named Anderson .Paak, released his third studio album called, Oxnard, which achieved success and peaked at #11 on the US Billboard 200 and #6 on the US Billboard Top R&B/Hip-Hop Albums charts.

In 2020, Saweetie released "Tap In" which reached the top twenty on the Billboard Hot 100 charts. The song was influenced by Bay Area hip hop and sampled Too Short's song "Blow the Whistle".

See also
 Culture of California
 Music of California 
 Music of Washington
 Music of Oregon
 East Coast vs. West Coast feud
 Hip hop music in the Pacific Northwest
 List of West Coast hip hop artists
 List of West Coast hip hop record labels
 Chicano rap
 Mexican hip hop
 Salvadoran hip hop

References 

 
1980s in music
1990s in music
2000s in music
2010s in music
American hip hop genres
G-funk
American hip hop scenes
Music of California